Romain Mesnil (born 13 June 1977 in Le Plessis-Bouchard) is a retired, French pole vaulter. His personal outdoor best is 5.95 metres, achieved in August 2003 in Castres. His personal indoor best is 5.86 metres, set in March 2001 in Toulouse. His coach was Georges Martin.

Biography
Mesnil won the 1999 European Athletics U23 Championships gold medal, 2 World Championship silvers, 1 World Indoor Championship bronze, 1 European Championship silver and 1 Universiade bronze. He won seven outdoor and three indoor French National Athletics Championships titles from 1998 to 2011.

In March 2009, Mesnil released a video of himself running naked through the streets of Paris as if to pole vault in Parisian tourist spots. The video, posted on YouTube, was an attempt to attract attention to his quest for a new sponsorship deal. His sponsorship contract with Nike had expired in 2008 and was not renewed.

Mesnil finished in 10th position (5.50m) in the pole vault final of the 2012 Summer Olympics in London, his fourth and final Olympic Games. He had previously taken part in the last three Olympics in Sydney, Athens and Beijing but had failed to qualify for the final each time.

Mesnil retired from pole vaulting in July 2013. His last competition - the Meeting Areva - was held on 6 July 2013 at the Stade de France in Paris.

Results in international competitions
Only the position and height in the final are indicated, unless otherwise stated. (q) means the athlete did not qualify for the final, with the overall position and height in the qualification round indicated.

See also
 French all-time top lists - Pole vault

References

External links

 
 
 
 

1977 births
Living people
People from Le Plessis-Bouchard
Sportspeople from Val-d'Oise
Tibet freedom activists
French male pole vaulters
Athletes (track and field) at the 2000 Summer Olympics
Athletes (track and field) at the 2004 Summer Olympics
Athletes (track and field) at the 2008 Summer Olympics
Athletes (track and field) at the 2012 Summer Olympics
Olympic athletes of France
World Athletics Championships medalists
European Athletics Championships medalists
Universiade medalists in athletics (track and field)
Universiade bronze medalists for France
Medalists at the 1999 Summer Universiade
20th-century French people
21st-century French people